In Ohio's 6th district, incumbent William Creighton Jr. resigned before December 19, 1828 when he was given a recess appointment to be a United States District Judge.  He was also nominated for the judgeship, but that appointment was not approved by the U.S. Senate by February 1829.  Creighton was already elected to the next term and was reseated in his old position when the next Congress began in March 1829.

Francis S. Muhlenberg was elected December 2, 1828 only to finish that short term.

See also 
 1828 United States House of Representatives elections in Ohio
 List of United States representatives from Ohio

Ohio 1828 06
Ohio 1828 06
1828 06
Ohio 06
United States House of Representatives 06
United States House of Representatives 1828 06